Farallones de Cali is a cluster of mountains in the West Andes of Colombia. It is located west of the city of Cali and gives rise to many of the rivers that provide water and electricity to Cali. The PNN Farallones de Cali encompasses  in the mountains as well as much of the Pacific slope and is an area of very high biodiversity. In this territory are located the district of Pichinde, Andes and Leonera, and two villages Penas Blancas and Lomas de la Cajita.

Climate and topography

Plants growing in the area have sufficient water throughout the year.

The topography of the park is characterized by the high, craggy peaks, the highest being .  These peaks are referred to as Los Farallones (which means cliffs), the namesake of the mountains and national park. The foothills on the eastern side meet the Cauca Valley and the city of Cali.  On the west slope there are numerous river canyons that wind their way toward the Pacific Ocean.

The Farrallones are visible from the city of Cali.

Rivers 
On the east slope the following rivers flow from the Farallones de Cali (from north to south):  Cali, Pichindé, Cañaveralejo, Melendez, Lilí, Pance, and Jamundí.  These river all flow into the Cauca River.

On the west slope there are many rivers flowing into the Pacific, but the main ones area the Dagua and Anchicayá.  There is a hydroelectric dam on the Anchicayá River.

National Park and biodiversity

The PNN Farallones de Cali is the largest national park in the Valle del Cauca Department and was formed in 1968. The area is popular for hiking and birdwatching. Access from Cali is by two main routes:  by way of the Pance River at the southern end or at the northern end via Peñas Blancas or the Pichindé River. Access to the Anchicayá area is via the town of El Queremal.

Ecological zones 

Due to extreme height of the mountains and the nearby Pacific Ocean, which largely determines the climate in western Colombia, there are various ecosystems in the park such as lowland jungle, mountain cloud forest and páramo.

This area is on the western slope of the West Andes and is part of the Chocó Biogeographic Region. One of the key areas of biodiversity is centered around the upper Anchicayá River watershed.

The cloud forest is usually blanketed in fog and inside the forest it is extremely mossy with many epiphytes. This ecosystem is also referred to as Subandean Forest - Bosque Subandino.

As the elevation increases the tree height generally decreases. This ecosystem is also referred to as Andean Forest - Bosque Andino.

This ecosystem is geographically isolated from other Northern Andean páramos and is unique in the fact that it does not have the characteristic Espeletia plant of the Colombian páramo.

The ecosystems in the park face several threats including commercial logging, illegal mining, agriculture, tourism, forest fires, hunting and road construction.

Characteristic fauna

Birds 
The Farallones de Cali is home to probably more than 300+ species of birds, including several endemic species such as the multicolored tanager (Chlorochrysa nitidissima), crested ant-tanager (Habia cristata) and chestnut wood-quail (Odontophorus hyperythrus).  Andean cock-of-the-rock (Rupicola peruvianus) leks can be observed, the most famous being in the Peñas Blancas area of the Pichindé River valley.  The avian diversity of the Anchicayá is world-renowned.

Mammals 
Mammal species that are possible throughout the various habitats include: bats, squirrels, procyonids, anteaters, several felids, foxes, and marsupials.  The spectacled bear (Tremarctos ornatus) has suitable habitat on the western slope of the mountains and is listed as a vulnerable species.

Five primates species exist within the park:
White-headed capuchin  - Mono manicero
Red howler
Mantled howler
Gray-bellied night monkey (Aotus lemurinus): listed as vulnerable; referred to as Marteja in Colombia.
Colombian spider monkey (Ateles fusciceps rufiventris): listed as critically endangered; referred to as Marimonda in Colombia.

Amphibians 
Bufo hypomelas ? - Sapo Mamboré
Dendrobates lehmanni - Red-banded poison frog or Oophaga lehmanni

Characteristic vegetation 

On the western slope, between 200 and 1,000 m, there is a dry tropical forest with trees up to 40 m high. Beneath these trees grow tall grasses. There are different kinds of lianas and woody vines. On top of tree branches there are numerous epiphytes. Some endemical species are called cargadera, guabo sleeper, wild cacao and sirop. Among the palms of this forest there is taparín, barrigona or pambil and cumbi.

In the temperate zone, between 1,000 and 2,000 meters the most representative tree species are oak, sapote bush, media cara, encenillo, azuceno, white yarumo and balsa.

The cold zone, between 2,400 and 3,600 meters, abounds in epiphytes. Above 3,600 meters starts the moorlands, where frailejones are the characteristic plant.  Among the Farallones endemisms there is a wild violet.

Geology

Sites of interest 

El Topacio
Acampadero Pance very close to town. To spend the night in a tent needed a permit from the Regional Autonomous Corporation of the Valle del Cauca - CVC. The parking area is very limited. It has basic services, including a radio station in the ranger's house. From Topaz can visit two waterfalls.

Pico de Loro
The trail starts at the Topaz. The upgrade can take several hours depending on the climber. At its peak, at 2832 meters above sea level is part of the city of Cali, Cauca river and its valley. No acampadero on top, on the rise there are several springs.

Punta Pance
With 4020 meters is a journey that can take one or two days, recommended for those with more experience as walkers. At the top is a unique view of the region. On clear days you can see to the west and the Pacific Ocean port of Buenaventura (really clear days you can see the larger vessels) looks eastward Cali, the river Cauca and valley, and eventually the Cordillera Central with sticking the Nevado del Huila, in the south-west you can see the Cerro Naya, to the northwest is the Cerro Calima.

You can camp at a place known as "Balconies" which has a spring and a wide area to accommodate tents 5-10. Another possibility is to climb a little higher and camping in Punta Pance Lagoons.

Alto del Buey
A 3480 m. His ascent is made from the input to Peñas Blancas and can take a whole day on a road in good condition. From the top is Part of Buenaventura and Cali. The camping area is limited allowing no more than 2 or 3 stores.

Gaps of Alto del Buey
It's tortuous descent from the top of the Ox, but sometimes necessary in the absence of water on top. From above gaps are much larger than they actually are. Remember to always go with a guide.

Valley de los Osos
Accessible from the mountain edge north of Punta Pance and towards the western side, there is a river and you see that landscape has been altered by man. It is located between the blade tip and the Massif Cajambres.

Macizo Cajambres
To the west of Punta Pance, after passing the Valley of the Bears. It shows some erosion in its eastern slopes.

Peñas Blancas

Gallery

See also 
 List of national parks of Colombia
 Andean Region, Colombia
 Pacific Region, Colombia
 List of mountains in the Andes
 List of Ultras of South America
 Pico Loro

References 

Páramos
Mountains of Colombia
National parks of Colombia
Geography of Valle del Cauca Department
Tourist attractions in Valle del Cauca Department
Protected areas established in 1968
Northwestern Andean montane forests
Chocó–Darién moist forests